Leonardo Hermes Lau or simply Lê (born December 18, 1984 in Santa Cruz do Sul), was a Brazilian attacking midfielder. He used to play for Esporte Clube Novo Hamburgo. Now he is a medical student at Universidade de Caxias do Sul.

Honours
Paraná State League: 2005
Rio Grande do Norte State League: 2007
Tricampeão da Copa Poloca: 2017/1-2017/2 - 2018/1

External links
 CBF
 ABC
 rubronegro
 abcnatal

1984 births
Living people
Brazilian footballers
Club Athletico Paranaense players
Esporte Clube Juventude players
Ceará Sporting Club players
Marília Atlético Clube players
Clube do Remo players
ABC Futebol Clube players
Brusque Futebol Clube players
Esporte Clube Novo Hamburgo players
Brazilian people of German descent
People from Santa Cruz do Sul
Association football midfielders
Sportspeople from Rio Grande do Sul